Women's Sacrifice (German: Frauenopfer) is a 1922 German silent film directed by Karl Grune and starring Henny Porten, William Dieterle and Albert Bassermann. It was adapted from the play by Georg Kaiser.

The film's sets were designed by Paul Leni.

Cast
 Henny Porten as Maria, Frau des Malers  
 William Dieterle as Maler 
 Albert Bassermann as Graf  
 Ludwig Rex as Verwalter  
 Frida Richard as Verwalter 
 Edgar Klitzsch as Kunsthändler  
 Adolf E. Licho as Alter Boheme

References

Bibliography
 James Robert Parish & Kingsley Canham. Film Directors Guide: Western Europe. Scarecrow Press, 1976.

External links

1922 films
Films of the Weimar Republic
Films based on works by Georg Kaiser
Films directed by Karl Grune
German silent feature films
UFA GmbH films
German black-and-white films